Dylan Coghlan (born February 19, 1998) is a Canadian professional ice hockey defenseman currently playing for the Carolina Hurricanes of the National Hockey League (NHL).

Early life
Coghlan was born on February 19, 1998, in Duncan, British Columbia but learned to skate in Port Hardy when his family lived there. As his family moved several times while he was growing up, Coghlan played for several minor hockey programs throughout the north and central Island. While living in Nanaimo, Coghlan said he took a big step in his career due to the exposure to Western Hockey League (WHL) scouts. He skated within the Nanaimo Minor Hockey system from 2009 to 2013 until he joined the North Island Silvertips of the BC Hockey Major Midget League at the age of 15.

Playing career
Coghlan spent the 2012–13 season with the Nanaimo Clippers of the British Columbia Hockey League, where he gained attention from WHL scouts. After he recorded 18 goals and 40 points through 34 games, he was drafted in the third round, 63rd overall, by the Tri-City Americans in the 2013 Bantam Draft.

Professional
He was signed by the Vegas Golden Knights as an undrafted free agent after attending the team's inaugural development and NHL training camp on September 20, 2017.

On March 10, 2021, Coghlan scored his first career NHL goal and his first career NHL hat trick against the Minnesota Wild, becoming the third defenseman in NHL history to score his first three career goals in the same game. Additionally, he became the first rookie and the first defenseman to register a hat trick as a Golden Knight in franchise history.

On July 13, 2022, Coghlan and Max Pacioretty were traded to the Carolina Hurricanes for future considerations.

Career statistics

References

External links

1998 births
Living people
Carolina Hurricanes players
Chicago Wolves players
Nanaimo Clippers players
Tri-City Americans players
Undrafted National Hockey League players
Vegas Golden Knights players
Canadian ice hockey defencemen
Ice hockey people from British Columbia